The Kansas City Southern Railway Depot is a historic former Kansas City Southern Railway station located at 750 West Georgia Avenue in Many, Louisiana. The depot was built in 1929 to replace the original depot, which opened in 1896 when the railroad was completed through the town. The Spanish Colonial Revival building features arched parapets atop projecting walls and corner piers with curved decorative pieces on top. Many's economy and municipal government were revitalized by the railway's completion, and the station brought both passengers and freight to and from the town. The local lumber industry, the chief export of Sabine Parish, shipped its products out through the station, and a small business district grew around the station.

The station was added to the National Register of Historic Places on September 22, 2000. At the time, it was used by the Sabine Council on Aging.

References

Railway stations on the National Register of Historic Places in Louisiana
Spanish Colonial Revival architecture in the United States
Railway stations in the United States opened in 1929
National Register of Historic Places in Sabine Parish, Louisiana
Kansas City Southern Railway stations
Railway depots in the United States
Railway depots on the National Register of Historic Places
Former railway stations in Louisiana